Ramdas Soren is an Indian politician. He is a member of Jharkhand Mukti Morcha.  He is the member of Jharkhand Legislative Assembly from the Ghatshila Constituency. In 2009 and 2019, he represented Ghatshila Constituency as the Member of Legislative Assembly twice in Purbi Singhbhum district.

References 

People from Jharkhand
Jharkhand Mukti Morcha politicians
Jharkhand politicians
Living people
People from East Singhbhum district
Santali people
Year of birth missing (living people)
Jharkhand MLAs 2009–2014
Jharkhand MLAs 2019–2024